Eden Blecher (born 27 November 1997) is an Israeli swimmer.

2020 Tokyo Summer Olympics
Blecher will be representing Israel in the 2020 Tokyo Summer Olympics artistic swimming events, alongside Shelly Brobitsky.

Career highlights

References

External links
 
 

Living people
1997 births
Israeli synchronized swimmers
Olympic synchronized swimmers of Israel
Synchronized swimmers at the 2020 Summer Olympics
Artistic swimmers at the 2022 World Aquatics Championships